Meremere is a small town in the northern Waikato region in the North Island of New Zealand. It is located on the east bank of the Waikato River, 50 kilometres north of Hamilton and 63 km south of Auckland.

Meremere was the site of fighting in 1863 during the New Zealand Wars, at which time the settlement (then known as Mere Mere) was the site of a Māori defensive outpost.

For a number of years a coal-fired power station operated in Meremere, and much of the workforce lived in the town.  The station was the first government-built large scale thermal power station, opening in 1958 and was a notable landmark for travellers along State Highway 1, which runs past the town. An aerial ropeway carried buckets of coal to the station from the Maramarua coal mine.  The station closed in 1991 and there were plans during the 1990s to convert the station into a waste to energy plant, using waste from Auckland. These plans, known as the Olivine project, did not eventuate. The site was used as a recycling centre from 2007 to at least 2017.

Demographics
Meremere is part of the larger Maramarua statistical area.

Meremere had a population of 543 at the 2018 New Zealand census, an increase of 78 people (16.8%) since the 2013 census, and an increase of 81 people (17.5%) since the 2006 census. There were 162 households, comprising 288 males and 267 females, giving a sex ratio of 1.08 males per female, with 165 people (30.4%) aged under 15 years, 102 (18.8%) aged 15 to 29, 246 (45.3%) aged 30 to 64, and 33 (6.1%) aged 65 or older.

Ethnicities were 47.5% European/Pākehā, 51.4% Māori, 11.0% Pacific peoples, 7.2% Asian, and 3.3% other ethnicities. People may identify with more than one ethnicity.

Although some people chose not to answer the census's question about religious affiliation, 58.0% had no religion, 27.6% were Christian, 2.2% had Māori religious beliefs, 1.1% were Hindu, 2.2% were Muslim, 0.6% were Buddhist and 2.8% had other religions.

Of those at least 15 years old, 27 (7.1%) people had a bachelor's or higher degree, and 108 (28.6%) people had no formal qualifications. 30 people (7.9%) earned over $70,000 compared to 17.2% nationally. The employment status of those at least 15 was that 186 (49.2%) people were employed full-time, 51 (13.5%) were part-time, and 48 (12.7%) were unemployed.

Drag strip
Meremere Dragway, New Zealand's only permanent drag racing facility, is nearby and hosts many popular motorsports events throughout the year including Import All-Stars, 4&Rotary Nationals, Nostalgia Drags, the IHRA Championships and Nightspeed Dragwars.

A new motorsports circuit has also been constructed alongside State Highway 1 to the south of Meremere, at Hampton Downs.

Education

The school became a full primary school in 2019, introducing classes for Year 7 and 8.

Panorama

References

Populated places in Waikato
Waikato District
Populated places on the Waikato River